Gallizien  is a town in the district of Völkermarkt in the Austrian state of Carinthia.

Geography
Gallizien lies in southern Carinthia on the boundary between the Rosen and Jaun valleys. The Vellach flows through it.

References

Cities and towns in Völkermarkt District